Bergen auf Rügen is the capital of the former district of Rügen in the middle of the island of Rügen in Mecklenburg-Western Pomerania, Germany. Since 1 January 2005, Bergen has moreover been the administrative seat of the Amt of Bergen auf Rügen, which with a population of over 23,000 is Mecklenburg-Vorpommern's most populous Amt.

Geography

Location 
Bergen is in the middle of Germany's biggest island, Rügen, on the Baltic Sea coast. The town lies in a hilly area, with the Rugard woods on the town's northeast outskirts reaching a height of 91 m above sea level. The area around Bergen is predominantly agricultural. The town itself is built on a glacial moraine deposited when the ice sheets retreated during the last ice age. Not far from central Bergen, to the northeast, is the Kleiner Jasmunder Bodden, a shallow bay, and to the southeast lies another bay, the Greifswalder Bodden, and with the town of Putbus.

South of the town is the Kiebitzmoor ("Peewit Moor") and to the northwest is the lake of Nonnensee which was reactivated a few years ago.

Subdivisions 
The following wards are parts of Bergen:

Bergen Süd 
Bergen Süd is the most populous district of Bergen. It consists mainly of plattenbau dwellings and was built in the mid-1960s. The buildings were renovated during the 1990s. Bergen Süd has one of the two cemeteries in the town and an industrial estate, where several car dealers, a social enterprise workshop for people with mental disabilities, the town cleaning department and other small companies are based.

Rotensee 
Rotensee is the second most populous district in Bergen and is situated in the west of the town. Just like Bergen Süd, Rotensee is made of plattenbau houses, built in the 1980s. Not until 2000 were the first houses renovated. Due to the declining population of the town, a number of houses were demolished or dismantled. Rotensee has two day care centres, a regional day school, the socio-cultural community centre/"multi-generational house" (NBZ Rotensee) and a special-needs school.

Tetel 
Tetel is the smallest district in Bergen. It is located southeast of Bergen auf Rügen near Zittvitz. Three families live in Tetel. The oldest house is about 120 years old.

History

Name 
The origin of the name stretches back to 1232 when there was a place on Rügen called Gora, a Slavic word for "mountain" (Berg in German) which came from the Polabian language spoken by the Rani (or Rujani), a Slavic people who once inhabited the area. The Roskilde Register (Roeskilder Matrikel) of 1294 mentioned the place as Villa Berghe. In 1278 it was called Berghe, in 1302 Bergh in Ruya and in 1306 Berghen. In 1314 it was mentioned in the records as villa montis.

On 6 November 1995, it was renamed from Bergen/Rügen to Bergen auf Rügen.

Middle Ages 
Bergen's history goes back over one thousand years. The first settlements on the present day territory of Bergen are, however, considerably older. During the Early Middle Ages, Rügen was settled by a Slavic tribe, the Rani who established a pagan worship site on Cape Arkona, defended by a fort, the Jaromarsburg. In the area of present-day Bergen, a castle was established on the Rugard hill.

When the tribe was subdued by the Danes, who erected the Principality of Rügen ruled by a local dynasty, the Rugard burgh became an administrative centre. With Danish rule, the principality became Christian and subject to German immigration in the course of the Ostsiedlung. While the Rugard stronghold included a suburbium already, the town of Bergen was erected on the neighbouring hilltop and not within the ramparts of the Rugard, that today are preserved in a park north of the town centre.

Soon after the fall of the Jaromarsburg in 1168, construction started on St. Mary's as the palace church of the Rügen prince, Jaromar I. In 1193 the church, now consecrated and complete apart from the westwork, was turned into a Cistercian convent. Even today there is an unusual curiosity here: the clock face on the north side of the church tower shows 61 minutes. The foundation of the abbey encouraged the first inn to be built in 1232.

In 1325, Bergen, along with the Principality of Rügen, became part of the Duchy of Pomerania by inheritance. Until the 15th century, Bergen was under the monastery's administration. Fires, such as that in 1445, almost destroyed the entire town, the monastery and parts of the church.

Early Modern era 

In 1534, after a decree by the Pomeranian Landtag in Treptow an der Rega (today Trzebiatów), the Reformation was introduced to Pomerania. Ownership of the monastery was transferred to the Pomeranian dukes.

In 1613, Bergen was granted Lübeck law town rights. This is exceptional when compared with most other Pomeranian towns, which had already been granted town rights in the 13th century. After the Thirty Years' War, the town became Swedish as part of Swedish Pomerania in 1648. In 1815, it became part of the Prussian Province of Pomerania.

19th century 
The first industrial enterprises were established in 1823 and 1853, when leather factories set up shop here. In 1883, the first trains reached Bergen station on the railway from Altefähr. In 1890, the dairy began operations and the following year, the post office was built by the marketplace. When in 1898 and 1899, the waterworks and the power station came into operation, and the infrastructure that Bergen had at its disposal made it worthy of being the district seat.

20th century 

Four days before the end of the Second World War, undefended Bergen was occupied by the Red Army on 4 May 1945. After the German Democratic Republic (East Germany) was founded, the new government pressed ahead with further industrialization. In 1952, construction began on the industrial area on the town's western outskirts. From 1953 to 1958, the dairy was established, which furnished 300 tonnes of milk daily. In 1955–1956 came the establishment of the VEB Brot- und Backwaren (Bread and Baked Goods). In 1957–1958, the slaughterhouse and meat plant went into production. An efficient food industry was set up in Bergen, supplied from the island and parts of the mainland. Since Reunification and East Germany's accession into the Federal Republic, the town has undergone a number of marked changes. The population dwindled from its former level of almost 20,000 to 16,500. Many prefabricated concrete structures, common in the former Warsaw Pact countries, were modernized and adapted to new demands. In addition, a few schools were closed and new hotels built. Historical downtown was completely renovated and decorated, giving it a new appeal.

Population growth

Transport

 Bergen auf Rügen railway station is served by trains to and from Berlin, Cologne, Dresden, Düsseldorf, Frankfurt, Hamburg, Hannover, Prague, Rostock, Stralsund and Stuttgart.

Bergen has essentially good transport connections. This refers to travel on the island of Rügen and the national rail system. The road connection with the mainland, on the other hand, used to be very choked. In summer, the Rügen Causeway – the bridge that joins Rügen to the mainland at Stralsund often became a bottleneck. This has recently been alleviated by the new Strelasund Crossing – a second crossing over the Strelasund with an expressway feeder.

Individually, the road network serving Bergen is as follows. The B 96 reaches Bergen from Stralsund, where it connects with the B 105 which leads to Rostock. Bergen is also accessible by car by taking the ferry from Glewitz. In Bergen, the road further branches into the B 196, affording access to the island's eastern area, where there are bathing beaches. The B 96 itself leads further on to Sassnitz.

Those who would rather forgo the car may also reach Bergen by train. Already by the time the first stretches of railway were built on Rügen in 1883, trains were reaching the island from afar. The island's capital, Bergen, has always profited from this, as it lies right on the main transport arteries to the bathing resorts and the harbour at Mukran (Sassnitz).

All parts of the island of Rügen can also be reached from Bergen by the many buslines there.

Until the 1960s, Bergen was also served by a local narrow gauge railway, the Rügen Light Railway, popularly known as Rasender Roland ("Racing Roland"), but the Deutsche Reichsbahn, which owned it at the time, shut all the lines in the central and northern parts of Rügen down at that time. Part of the system still runs, however.

Recreation 
 Not far from the historic town centre is the Rugard Forest (Rugardwald). From the Ernst Moritz Arndt Tower, at 91 m above sea level, there is a stunning panoramic view far across Rügen.
 In the northern part of the Rugard Forest, a summer luge track was opened on 25 June 2005.
 Bergen Rotensee Socio-cultural Neighbourhood Centre, since February 2005 with club-cinema. Readings, concerts and creative arts are held here.

Culture and sights

Museums 
The museum of the town of Bergen is located in one of the carefully restored buildings of the former abbey. The exhibition covers the following:
 Ground floor: prehistory and early history of Rügen, from the Stone Age to the end of the Slavic period in 1168, when Christianity came to the island
 Upstairs: Bergen's town history from the foundation of the abbey to the mid-19th century.

Buildings 

 The former abbey church, St. Mary's, began in 1168 as a palace church for the Rügen prince, Jaromar I, and was completed before 1193, apart from the westwork. The triple-aisled basilica church is the oldest surviving brick building in Mecklenburg-Western Pomerania. The gravestone recessed into the outer wall of St. Mary's Church is believed to be that of the Prince. Of note is the Roman mural, the only example in northern Germany of the complete painting of a church. In the 14th century it was expanded  into a hall church.
 St. Boniface's Church, seat of the Roman Catholic Church in Rügen.
 The monastery buildings of Bergen Abbey, founded in 1193, date to the 12th and 13th centuries. Some were knocked down in 1600 and after 1829, leaving only remnants of the refectory in the carriage house and two two-storey brick houses from 1732.
 Many town houses, mostly two-story timber framed buildings, for example those in Kirchplatz 13 with its brick facade.
 Many notable front doors, for example, Mühlenstraße 4
 Memorial stone at the "cemetery" entrance in Billrothstraße for twelve murdered prisoners at Stutthof concentration camp who, during the evacuation of the camp and their arrival in Lauterbach were shot by SS troops and buried in 1947 in Bergen.
 1964 memorial on Rugardweg to anti-fascist resistance fighters
 Adjacent to the historic town centre is the woodland area of Rugard.
 A sommerrodelbahn opened on 25 June 2005 in the northern part of the Rugard.
 The Bergen Rotensee "socio-cultural community centre", with cinema club, open since February 2005. Readings, concerts and creative art exhibitions are at held here.

Notable people from Bergen auf Rügen 
 George Boldt, US entrepreneur, hotelier, and builder of Boldt Castle in New York State's Thousand Islands
 Holger Teschke, German writer
 Arnold Ruge (1802–1880), writer

 Theodor Billroth (1829–1894), doctor and surgeon
 Hans Delbrück, (1848–1929), German historian and politician
 Karl Albrecht (1859–1929), Protestant theologian, philologist and orientalist
 Hans Langsdorff (1894–1939), naval officer
 Gerhard Gentzen, (1909–1945), German logician
 Andreas Khol (born 1941), Austrian politician
 Diana Gansky (born 1963), athlete and Olympic medalists
 Nils Jörn (born 1964), historian and archivist
 Ines Pianka (born 1969), volleyball player
 Steffi Nerius (born 1972), lightheads (javelin throwing)
 Devid Striesow (born 1973), actor
 Martin Hoffmann (born 1984), ice hockey player

City partnerships
  Oldenburg in Holstein, Germany
  Svedala, Sweden
  Goleniów, Poland

Pictures

Literature
 Gustav Kratz: Die Städte der Provinz Pommern – Abriss ihrer Geschichte, zumeist nach Urkunden. Berlin 1965 (Nachdruck 1996 durch Sändig Reprint Verlag, Vaduz), pp. 39–42 (Volltext).
 Wolfgang Rudolph: Die Insel Rügen. Hinstorff Verlag, Rostock 1999, .
 Sabine-Maria Weitzel: Die romanischen Wandmalereien im Chor und Querschiff der St.-Marien-Kirche in Bergen auf Rügen – Original und Erfindung. In: Baltische Studien. Pommersche Jahrbücher für Landesgeschichte. Neue Folge Band 91 (Band 137 Der Gesamtreihe) 2005, Kiel 2006, pp. 39–60.
 Gerold Schmidt: Der Kirchenmaler und Mosaikkünstler des Historismus Prof. August Oetken (1868–1951). In: Das Melanchthonhaus Bretten. Verlag Regionalkultur, Ubstadt-Weiher 1997, pp. 167–212.

References

External links

Official website of Bergen auf Rügen
Bergen Marienkirche church and church community
(all in German)

 
Vorpommern-Rügen
Towns and villages on Rügen
Populated places established in 1613
1613 establishments in the Holy Roman Empire